Toot & Puddle may refer to:

 Toot & Puddle, a book series by Holly Hobbie
 Toot & Puddle (TV series), a TV series that aired on Noggin in 2008